Vallonia eiapopeia is a species of small, air-breathing land snail, a terrestrial pulmonate gastropod mollusk in the family Valloniidae.

Description

Distribution

References

External links
Global Names Index entry
Index of New Taxa
Vallonidae species

Valloniidae
Gastropods described in 1996